Oakhill School is a coeducational private Roman Catholic school, situated in the village of Whalley (near the town of Clitheroe) in rural Lancashire, England.

Notable former pupils
Henry Holland (fashion designer)

Schools in Ribble Valley
Roman Catholic private schools in the Diocese of Salford
Private schools in Lancashire
Educational institutions established in 1979
1979 establishments in England